Driver is a surname of German origin, which referred to someone from the ancient Celtic tribe of Treveri who once inhabited the lower valley of the Moselle between France, Belgium and Germany. The name was originally Trever and has other variants such as Treviri, Triver, Trevor, or Trier. In England, it is an occupational surname meaning the driver of horses or oxen attached to a cart or plough, or of loose cattle. It is recorded since the thirteenth century.

List of People with the surname Driver
 Alfred Carter (cricketer), Australian Rules footballer who played for four seasons (1888–1891) under the assumed surname "Driver"
 Adam Driver (born 1983), American actor
 Alexander Gooch and Alice Driver (both died 1558), English Protestant martyrs
 Andrew Driver (born 1987), English footballer
 Arthur Driver (1909–1981), Australian engineer, army officer, and public servant
 Betty Driver (1920–2011), English singer, actress. and author
 Bruce Driver (born 1962), Canadian ice-hockey player
 Charles Henry Driver (1832–1900), British architect
 Chris Driver (born 1981), English entertainer
 Craig Driver (born 1988), American baseball coach
 Danny Driver (born 1977), British classical pianist
 Danny Driver (born 1977), American businessman and music producer
 Donald Driver (born 1975), American football player
 Godfrey Rolles Driver (1892–1975), English orientalist
 James G. Driver (1889–1975), American college basketball coach
 Jeremiah Driver (1861–1946), English cricketer
 Jon Driver (1962–2011), British psychologist and neuroscientist
 Jonty Driver (born 1939), South African anti-apartheid activist, former political prisoner, educationalist, poet and writer
 Michael B. Driver (1868–1942), American politician
 Minnie Driver (born 1970), English actress and singer
 Moses Driver, Fijian police officer
 Nancy Driver (1933-2009), better known as Nancy Walters, American model, actress, and minister
 Oliver Driver (born 1974), New Zealand actor and director
 Paddy Driver (born 1934), South African motorcyclist and racing driver
 Richard Driver (1829–1880), Australian solicitor, politician, and cricket administrator
 Rod Driver (1932-2022), American mathematician and politician
 Ryan Driver (born 1979), English cricketer
 Samuel Rolles Driver (1846–1914), English biblical scholar
 Sara Driver (born 1945), American filmmaker
 Toby Driver (born 1978), American avant-garde musician, founder of Kayo Dot
 William Driver (1803–1886), American ship's captain who coined the phrase "Old Glory" for the U.S. flag
 William J. Driver (1873–1948), American politician from Arkansas
 William L. Driver (1883–1941), American football coach for Washburn University, Mississippi, TCU, and UC Davis

See also
 Driver

References

English-language surnames
Occupational surnames